Yang Duk-soon (born 22 October 1933,) is a North Korean cross-country skier. He competed in the men's 30 kilometre event at the 1964 Winter Olympics.

References

External links
 

1933 births
Living people
North Korean male cross-country skiers
Olympic cross-country skiers of North Korea
Cross-country skiers at the 1964 Winter Olympics
Place of birth missing (living people)